The 12th annual Berlin International Film Festival was held from 22 June – 3 July 1962. The Golden Bear was awarded to the British film A Kind of Loving directed by John Schlesinger.

Jury

The following people were announced as being on the jury for the festival:

International feature film jury
 King Vidor, director, screenwriter and producer (United States) - Jury President
 André Michel, director and screenwriter (France)
 Emeric Pressburger, director, screenwriter and producer (United Kingdom)
 Hideo Kikumori, film critic (Japan)
 Dolores del Río, actress (Mexico)
 Jurgen Schildt, film critic (Sweden)
 Max Gammeter, president of Filmgilde Biel (Switzerland)
 Günther Stapenhorst, producer (West Germany)
 Bruno E. Werner, writer and art critic (West Germany)

International documentary and short jury
 Olavi Linnus, writer and screenwriter (Finland) - Jury President
 Dorothy Macpherson, art film curator (Canada)
 Abdellah Masbahi, screenwriter (Morocco)
 Karl-Otto Alberty, actor (West Germany)
 Pia Maria Plechl, journalist and writer (Austria)
 Fridolin Schmid, producer and director of Film and Picture Institute, Munich (West Germany)
 A. L. Srinivasan, producer (India)

Films in competition
The following films were in competition for the Golden Bear award:

Key
{| class="wikitable" width="550" colspan="1"
| style="background:#FFDEAD;" align="center"| †
|Winner of the main award for best film in its section
|}

Awards
The following prizes were awarded by the Jury:

International jury awards
 Golden Bear: A Kind of Loving by John Schlesinger
 Silver Bear for Best Director: Francesco Rosi for Salvatore Giuliano
 Silver Bear for Best Actress: Rita Gam and Viveca Lindfors for No Exit
 Silver Bear for Best Actor: James Stewart for Mr. Hobbs Takes a Vacation
 Silver Bear Extraordinary Jury Prize: Isaengmyeong dahadorok by Sang-ok Shin

Documentaries and short films jury awards
 Silver Bear, special award (Documentaries): Galapagos - Trauminsel im Pazifik by Heinz Sielmann
 Short Film Golden Bear: De werkelijkheid van Karel Appel by Jan Vrijman
 Silver Bear for Best Short Film: Le Grand Magal de Touba by Blaise Senghor
 Silver Bear Extraordinary Jury Prize: ex aequoNahanni by Donald WilderThe Ancestors by André LibikVenedig by Kurt SteinwendnerTest for the West: Berlin by Franz Baake

Independent jury awards
FIPRESCI Award
Zoo by Bert Haanstra
OCIC Award
Såsom i en spegel by Ingmar Bergman

Youth Film Award (Jugendfilmpreis):
Best Feature Film Suitable for Young People: Donnez-moi dix hommes désespérés by Pierre Zimmer
Honorable Mention: Pikku Pietarin piha by Jack Witikka
Best Documentary Film Suitable for Young People: Galapagos – Trauminsel im Pazifik by Heinz Sielmann
Best Short Film Suitable for Young People: Zoo by Bert Haanstra

References

External links
 12th Berlin International Film Festival 1962
1962 Berlin International Film Festival
Berlin International Film Festival:1962  at Internet Movie Database

12
1962 film festivals
1962 in West Germany
1960s in West Berlin